Dark Dominion is an American comic book series that was published monthly by Defiant Comics from October of 1993 until July of 1994.  It spanned a total of 10 issues until Defiant ceased publication.  There was one #0 issue published as a trading card set and binder.

Dark Dominion was created by Jim Shooter and Steve Ditko, the co-creator of Spider-Man.  The concept was based on Shooter's idea that "fear is the root of all evil", and dealt with Shooter's fascination with quantum mechanics.

Characters

 Michael Alexander - The protagonist of the series.
 Chasm - The main antagonist of the series.

Plot synopsis

The comic was based in Manhattan and featured the main character Michael Alexander.

Alexander is the author of a book entitled Dark Dominion, in which he explored the idea that another world occupied the same spacetime as our own.  On this alternate world, which housed the sub-stratum of our world, demons arose from the fears of human beings.  The only way to see this hidden world was to put aside one's fears.

The main villain, Chasm, has chosen Manhattan to be his headquarters on Earth because of the vast population on whose fears he could draw from.

Michael Alexander is not afraid to face Chasm and the demons of the Dark Dominion. He perceives this alternate dimension as an energy-filled double of our own, with various demonic-type bits of architecture added to it. Monsters tended to ride the very humans they afflicted. This is seen in a  crossover with another Defiant title, Charlemagne, when he tears creatures from the minds of affected dockworkers. The same issue sees Michael befriending a super-powered 'fish out of water' named Charles.

Aftermath

The story of Dark Dominion was only published for ten issues. Four more issues were solicited, and one more issue was produced: however, due to the closing of the company, they were never released.  According to Shooter, Defiant ran out of money sometime in 1994.

Afterwards, all their comics ceased to be published and the characters - including those of Dark Dominion - were purchased by Golden Books. The rights have since shifted to Random House.  Shooter has expressed an interest in re-visiting the characters and story.

References

External links
Dark Dominion information at the Grand Comics Database

1993 comics debuts
Characters created by Jim Shooter
Defiant Comics titles
Science fiction comics
Comics by Steve Ditko